Jabal Umayyid is a mountain located in the Madiyan Mountains of northwest Saudi Arabia, near the Jordan border, above the Gulf of Aqaba, and is located in Tabūk, Saudi Arabia. It is one of the tallest mountains in the Arabian Peninsula.

References

Umayyid
Midian